"Dead Man's Hand" is the series premiere of the American murder mystery comedy-drama television series Poker Face. The episode was written and directed by series creator Rian Johnson. It was released on Peacock on January 26, 2023, alongside the three follow-up episodes.

The series follows Charlie Cale, a woman with the ability to detect if people are lying. After using her ability to win poker tournaments, she is caught by a powerful casino owner in Laughlin. Rather than banning her from his casino, he gives her a job as a waitress. The episode follows Charlie as she finds that her friend Natalie has been killed, deducing that her death was staged to cover a bigger crime.

The series premiere received positive reviews from critics, who praised Johnson's directing, writing, editing, cinematography, Lyonne's performances and pacing as strong points.

Plot
While cleaning a hotel room at the Frost Casino, a housekeeper named Natalie (Dascha Polanco) discovers disturbing content on the laptop computer of Kazimir Caine, a very wealthy patron of the casino. She takes a picture with her phone and shows it to the head of security, Cliff LeGrand (Benjamin Bratt), and the casino's manager, Sterling Frost Jr. (Adrien Brody). Sterling claims he will take care of the matter, discreetly deleting the photos from her phone and telling her to go home. Acting on Sterling's orders, Cliff kills Natalie and her husband, staging the crime scene to look like a murder–suicide.

Earlier that day, Natalie had carpooled with her friend Charlie Cale (Natasha Lyonne), who works at the casino as a cocktail waitress. Shortly after their arrival, Natalie's abusive alcoholic husband Jerry burst into the casino, demanding to see her. Charlie distracted him until Cliff and security guards were able to take his gun and throw him out of the building.

Charlie has the ability to detect lies, which Sterling wants to utilize to fleece Caine during the illegal poker games he holds in his hotel room rather than gamble on the casino floor. Appealing to her senses of loyalty to, and fear of, Sterling Frost Sr., who had spared her life when he caught her using her lie-detecting skills playing poker at the casino several years earlier, Sterling persuades Charlie to join his plan. Although she feels some unease that he twice interrupted their meetings to take mysterious phone calls, Charlie could tell that Sterling is telling the truth when he confessed to hoping to impress his father, who considers him to be barely capable of running the casino.

The next day, Charlie learns of Natalie's murder, with the police concluding that Jerry killed her and then killed himself. Charlie suspects something else must have happened, since Natalie called her before her shift was over and left the casino in a hurry. She goes to the police station. Although she is denied access to the evidence locker, she sees a picture of the crime scene depicting Jerry with his gun in his right hand. Charlie knows that Jerry was left-handed. Sterling is informed of her visit and angrily orders Charlie to stop investigating any further and focus on their plan.

Ignoring his warning, Charlie sneaks into Natalie's home. She retrieves Natalie's tablet computer and is eventually able to unlock it. On it she finds the deleted photos from Natalie's phone, including of the criminal content on Caine's laptop. She takes this evidence to Sterling, who claims they will report Caine to the FBI after their operation that night. While at a bar, she sees a news report of the murder–suicide that includes video footage of Jerry's outburst and expulsion from the casino.

As they prepare their operation, Charlie confronts Sterling, telling him she knows he ordered Cliff to murder Natalie. She shows him the footage of Jerry's expulsion: as he passed through the metal detector, the indicator light did not illuminate, proving he did not have his gun anymore (because Cliff kept it). Sterling rebuffs the claims, as there is no tangible evidence, and threatens to make her seem like a suicide herself by throwing her off the balcony. However, Charlie reveals she recorded and then sent to Caine a conversation where Sterling detailed the plan to fleece him. While the recording cannot incriminate him for criminal activity, it damages the casino's reputation, prompting Caine and many of the other high rollers to blackball the casino. Realizing that his plans have blown up in his face, Sterling throws himself off the balcony.

Cliff chases Charlie through the halls, and shoots her in the side. She manages to leave the casino through a window and escapes Laughlin. At a bar, she sends the photos that Natalie took from Caine's laptop to the authorities. She is then called by Sterling Frost Sr. (Ron Perlman), who, devastated by the loss of his son, vows to track her down and kill her. She destroys her phone and flees in her blue Plymouth Barracuda.

Production

Development

The project was announced in March 2021, with Rian Johnson serving as creator, writer, director and executive producer. Johnson stated that the series would delve into "the type of fun, character driven, case-of-the-week mystery goodness I grew up watching." The series was inspired by Columbo, being referred to as a "howcatchem". Johnson also used Magnum, P.I., The Rockford Files, Quantum Leap, Highway to Heaven and The Incredible Hulk as influences for the tone of the series. Johnson was interested in "doing that Columbo or even Quantum Leap thing of having every episode be an anthropological deep dive into a little corner of America that you might not otherwise see." The episode was directed by Johnson, who also wrote it. According to Johnson, the episode was written in 2020, before he started writing Glass Onion: A Knives Out Mystery.

Casting
The announcement of the series included that Natasha Lyonne would serve as the main lead actress. She was approached by Johnson about working on a procedural project together, with Lyonne as the lead character. As Johnson explained, the role was "completely cut to measure for her." While the series and lead character would share things in common with Columbo, the writers sought to differentiate the lead character by making her a con artist, instead of working with the law.

Due to the series' procedural aspects, the episodes feature several guest stars. Johnson was inspired by the amount of actors who guest starred on Columbo, wanting to treat each guest star as the star of the episode, which allowed them to attract many actors. The episode featured appearances by Adrien Brody and Dascha Polanco, who were announced to guest star in April and June 2022, respectively. The episode features an appearance by Noah Segan, a frequent collaborator of Johnson. Ron Perlman also guest stars in the series as Sterling Frost Sr., with his role credited as a voice cameo in the final scenes of the episode. The episode also includes an uncredited appearance by Ted Griffin, who previously worked with Johnson in Terriers. 

In April 2022, Benjamin Bratt joined the series. Instead of a guest role, his character would recur as Cliff, the head of security at a casino where Charlie works. When she escapes the casino, his character would go after her, deeming it "a ticking clock for the show".

Filming
Despite being written as the series premiere, it was actually the second episode to be filmed. The exterior shots were filmed in Laughlin, Nevada, six months after filming on the episode had wrapped, with the Riverside Resort Hotel & Casino depicting the fictional Frost Casino.

Critical reception
"Dead Man's Hand" received extremely positive reviews from critics. Saloni Gajjar of The A.V. Club gave the episode an "A-" grade and wrote, "Poker Face is clearly Charlie's story, but each episode presents enticing and serious subplots even if we don't spend sufficient time with them. The premiere's case deals with a child pornography ring that Frost Casino may or may not benefit from. Since Charlie is our lens into it all, and she's embarked on a road trip far away from Vegas, it's all we'll ever know (for now, at least). But that's alright because, as established, Charlie's journey is compellingly told."

Alan Sepinwall of Rolling Stone wrote, "Goddamn, what a relief and delight it is to see a TV show that actually wants to be a TV show, and that knows how to do that at this high a level." Amanda Whiting of Vulture gave the episode a 4 star rating out of 5 and wrote, "All in all, the episode is a fun little low-stakes romp — low-stakes because Sterling is such a smarmy buffoon that he can’t muster anything approaching actual menace." 

Daniel D'Addario of Variety praised Lyonne's character, writing, "the character is a profound underachiever, capable of detecting any lie (and, as such, dominating at the card table) but content to take whatever job comes her way." Lauren Milici of Total Film gave the episode a 4.5 star rating out of 5 and wrote, "Poker Face is a modern throwback of a genre we haven't seen since the '90s. Sure, Knives Outs Benoit Blanc is an icon in his own right, but Charlie Cale is the relatable hero we've all been waiting for. Each episode pits her against a brand new guest star, and God only knows what other horrors she'll encounter while on the run. We're off to a great start for what's sure to be one hell of a ride."

References

External links
 

Poker Face (TV series) episodes
2023 American television episodes
American television series premieres
Television episodes directed by Rian Johnson
Television episodes set in Nevada
Television episodes written by Rian Johnson